Bijan Zarnegar (25 March 1940 in Kermanshah, Iran – 21 April 2017 in Tehran, Iran) was an Iranian practitioner of fencing.

He started fencing when he was 18 years old in Tehran while studying at the Police University in Tehran. He worked as a police officer while he was practicing fencing. He competed in the individual and team foil, épée and sabre events at the 1964 Summer Olympics.

He died in 2017 in Tehran.

References

1940 births
2017 deaths
Iranian male épée fencers
Olympic fencers of Iran
Fencers at the 1964 Summer Olympics
Iranian male foil fencers
Iranian male sabre fencers
20th-century Iranian people
21st-century Iranian people